HMS Malcolm was a , one of a dozen second-rate anti-submarine frigates built for the Royal Navy in the 1950s. She was commissioned on 12 December 1957 and decommissioned in 1978.  She was the second Royal Navy ship to be bear the name, and was named after Admiral Sir Pulteney Malcolm, who served during the French Revolutionary and Napoleonic Wars.

The Cod Wars
Just after she was commissioned, a dispute started in the North Atlantic.  Relations between the United Kingdom and Iceland deteriorated and there was concern that the Landhelgisgæsla (the Icelandic Coast Guard) might threaten British fishermen.

Malcolm joined the Fishery Patrol Squadron in April 1959, continuing on these duties until 1965. Malcolm was part of a five-ship group that was deployed to Iceland for fishery protection duties in what became known as the Cod Wars.  She operated out of Edinburgh during the first Cod War, and from Rosyth after that.

Malcolm was refitted at Rosyth from February 1965 until March 1966, when she rejoined the Fishery Patrol Squadron. In 1967 Malcolm joined the 20th Frigate Squadron based at Londonderry. Duties included training with submarines while continuing to carry out fishery protection patrols.

In December 1970, Kevin McNamara MP raised concerns that Malcolm would not be replaced by another frigate after its return to home waters, stressing that Malcolms medical support was essential to fishing operations off Iceland. The Ministry of Defence decided not to replace Malcolm immediately, probably because the situation had calmed somewhat (1970 was between the first and second Cod Wars).  Responsibility for supporting the fishing fleet was henceforth the Department of Trade and Industry's.

The dispute ended in 1976. Two years later, Malcolm was decommissioned.  She was considered too small to act as a modern frigate and therefore unable to continue service into the 1980s.

Notes

References

Publications

 

Blackwood-class frigates
1955 ships
Ships of the Fishery Protection Squadron of the United Kingdom